This list consists of college football players who forfeited remaining collegiate eligibility and were declared by the National Football League (NFL) as eligible to be selected in the 2016 NFL draft. This includes juniors and redshirt sophomores who completed high school at least three years prior to the draft. A player that meets these requirements can renounce his remaining NCAA eligibility and enter the draft. Players had until January 18, 2016, to declare their intention to forgo their remaining collegiate eligibility.

Complete list of players

The following players were granted special eligibility to enter the 2016 draft:

References
Early entrant references

2016 NFL draft early entrants
Draft early entrants
NFL Draft early entrants